The Third Thaçi cabinet was the cabinet of Kosovo led by Prime Minister Hashim Thaçi between 17 February 2008 and 9 December 2014.

Composition
The cabinet consisted of the following Ministers:

References

Government ministers of Kosovo
Government of Kosovo
Cabinets established in 2008
Cabinets disestablished in 2014